The abbreviation ASDAH may refer to:

 Auckland Seventh-day Adventist High School
 Association of Seventh-day Adventist Historians